Vation may refer to:

 The putative surname of Agro (puppet), Australian puppet and media personality
 Man-O-Vations, a recurring concept in The Man Show